Aleksandar Katanić (born 15 August 1995) is a Serbian football forward who plays for the Serbian team Mladost Novi Sad.

Club career
On 21 January 2022, Katanić signed with Honka in Finland. His contract with Honka was terminated by mutual consent on 5 July 2022.

References

External links
 
 
 
 Aleksandar Katanić at superliga.rs

1995 births
Living people
Sportspeople from Loznica
Association football forwards
Serbian footballers
FK Teleoptik players
OFK Bačka players
FK Bežanija players
FK Metalac Gornji Milanovac players
FK Loznica players
FK Radnički Klupci players
FK Mladost Lučani players
FC Honka players
Serbian First League players
Serbian SuperLiga players
Serbian expatriate footballers
Expatriate footballers in Finland
Serbian expatriate sportspeople in Finland
Veikkausliiga players